Ana Meded (born 19 March 1996) is an Australian handball player for Melbourne HC and the Australian national team.

She represented Australia at the 2013 World Women's Handball Championship in Serbia and the 2019 World Women's Handball Championship.

References

Australian female handball players
1996 births
Living people